DMAX is a former TV channel in the Middle East and North Africa. beIN Media Group and Discovery, Inc. announced in February 2016, that they would launch a version of DMAX in the MENA market.
The channel was launched on 1 August 2016 and broadcast on beIN Network.

It stands for Discovery Movie Animation Xtra.

References

MENA
Arabic-language television stations
Television channels and stations established in 2016
Television channels and stations disestablished in 2021
Television stations in the United Arab Emirates
Men's interest channels
Television channel articles with incorrect naming style
Warner Bros. Discovery EMEA